The OODA loop is the cycle observe–orient–decide–act, developed by military strategist and United States Air Force Colonel John Boyd. Boyd applied the concept to the combat operations process, often at the operational level during military campaigns.  It is now also often applied to understand commercial operations and learning processes.  The approach explains how agility can overcome raw power in dealing with human opponents. It is especially applicable to cyber security and cyberwarfare.

The OODA loop has become an important concept in litigation, business, law enforcement, management education, and military strategy. According to Boyd, decision-making occurs in a recurring cycle of observe–orient–decide–act. An entity (whether an individual or an organization) that can process this cycle quickly, observing and reacting to unfolding events more rapidly than an opponent, can thereby "get inside" the opponent's decision cycle and gain the advantage.

The Chief Advisor to the UK Prime Minister Dominic Cummings credits the success of the Vote Leave campaign in the 2016 United Kingdom European Union membership referendum to its faster processing of OODA loops, along with the focus of Vote Leave on disrupting the OODA loops of the opposing Britain Stronger in Europe campaign team.

See also

 Control theory
 Decision cycle
 Double-loop learning
 Improvement cycle
 DMAIC
 PDCA
 Learning cycle
 Maneuver warfare
 Mental model
 Nursing process
 Problem solving
 Situation awareness
 SWOT analysis
 United States Army Strategist

Notes

References
 
 Boyd, John, R., The Essence of Winning and Losing, 28 June 1995 a five slide set by Boyd.
 
 Greene, Robert, OODA and You
 Hillaker, Harry, Code one magazine, "John Boyd, USAF Retired, Father of the F16", July 1997.
 Linger, Henry, Constructing The Infrastructure for the Knowledge Economy: Methods and Tools, Theory and Practice, p. 449
 Metayer, Estelle, Decision making: It's all about taking off – and landing safely…, Competia, December 2011
 Osinga, Frans, "Science, Strategy and War The Strategic Theory of John Boyd"
 Richards, Chet, Certain to Win: the Strategy of John Boyd, Applied to Business (2004) 
 Ullman, David G., "OO-OO-OO!” The Sound of a Broken OODA Loop], Crosstalk, April 2007

External links 
 Archived documents
 Video: The OODA Loop and Clausewitzian "Friction"
 Bazin, A. (2005). "Boyd's OODA Loop and the Infantry Company Commander". Infantry Magazine.
 OODA Loop 2.0: Information, Not Agility, Is Life OODA Loop 2.0: Information, Not Agility, Is Life

Feedback
Intelligence analysis
Management cybernetics
Strategy
Systems analysis
United States Air Force